Terakaly is a musical group from the southwestern region of Madagascar. They perform a contemporary blend of traditional music from the region, including beko and tsapiky. The band enjoyed nationwide success with its first single, "Avia Mouna", which was released in 1999. After a period of intense popularity, the band lost ground to other new artists and only regained nationwide exposure with the release of a new album in 2009. The band was a launching point for several other successful artists, most notably including Tsiliva, who ranks among the most popular contemporary performers of the kilalaka genre.

See also
Music of Madagascar

References

Malagasy musical groups